The Disney Dining Plan is a prepaid meal package that guests staying at Walt Disney World hotels can purchase in order to receive discounts up to 30% on food in the complex. It was first introduced in 2005 and has developed in complexity over time, such that there are now many different forms of the plan. The Disney Dining Plan allows guests to eat at park restaurants without needing to have cash on their persons. The plan does now include alcoholic beverages but not gratuities. More than 100 Walt Disney World restaurants accept the plan. The plan is particularly cost-effective for families who intend to eat many meals at sit-down restaurants or character dining restaurants. However, in order to get the most value (or to even break even) when using the plan, families must be mindful when using their Dining Plan Credits otherwise they may risk actually spending more than if they ordered the same food but paid out of pocket.

The plan has been criticized for various reasons including that servers are sometimes insufficiently knowledgeable about which food items are considered meals and which are considered snacks. The introduction of the Disney Dining Plan resulted in more parents bringing their children to Walt Disney World's most expensive restaurants, which Kim Wiley and Leigh Jenkins write in their book Walt Disney World with Kids 2013 "is indirectly taking a little of the adult feel and glamour out of these top restaurants." In the book Mousejunkies!, Bill Burke complains that the Disney Dining Plan has restricted the restaurants' menus. Annie Oeth of The Clarion-Ledger argues that the Disney Dining Plan is a poor choice for families with picky eaters.

References

Bibliography

Walt Disney World
Payment cards
Walt Disney World restaurants
2005 establishments in Florida